The first lady of  Ivory Coast (French: Première dame de Côte d'Ivoire) is the title attributed to the wife of the president of Ivory Coast. The current first lady is Dominique Ouattara, who has held the office since 11 April 2011. (Dominique Ouattara and her predecessor, Simone Gbagbo, were the co-claimants of the office from 4 December 2010 to 11 April 2011.)

First ladies of Ivory Coast

Co-claimants from 4 December 2010 to 11 April 2011

See also
List of heads of state of Ivory Coast

References

 
Politics of Ivory Coast
Ivory Coast